John Langdon may refer to:

John Langdon (bishop) (died 1434), English Bishop of Rochester
John Langdon (driver) (born 1947), New Zealand harness race driver
John Langdon (historian) (1944–2016), Canadian historian
John Langdon (politician) (1741–1819), American politician from New Hampshire
John Langdon (typographer) (born 1946), American typographer known for his ambigrams

See also
John Langdon Down (1828–96), British physician